Fahsa is a Yemeni stew. It is made of lamb cutlets with lamb broth. Spices and hilbah (a dip made with fenugreek) are added after cooking.

See also
 List of lamb dishes
 List of stews

References

Arab cuisine
Yemeni stews
Lamb dishes